The Southern Athletic Association men's basketball tournament is the annual conference basketball championship tournament for the NCAA Division III Southern Athletic Association. The tournament has been held annually since 2013. It is a single-elimination tournament and seeding is based on regular season records.

The winner receives the SAA's automatic bid to the NCAA Men's Division III Basketball Championship.

Results

Championship records

 Millsaps has not yet qualified for the SAA tournament final.
 The SAA has had no membership changes since it began play in 2012–13.

References

NCAA Division III men's basketball conference tournaments
Basketball Tournament, Men's
Recurring sporting events established in 2013